Castello di Volpaia is a winery located in the medieval village of Volpaia. The estate is over  divided between vineyards, olive groves, and woods. The winery is organically farmed for producing extra virgin olive oil, vinegar and wine, in particular Chianti Classico. The winery is owned by Carlo and Giovannella Mascheroni Stianti, who are assisted by their son Nicolo' Mascheroni Stianti.

Overview

Volpaia was built in the 11th century as a fortified village on the Florence-Siena border. Unlike Brolio, Meleto and other Chianti-area castles, Volpaia is a terra murata, a walled village. Although only part of the original protective walls and two of its six towers are still standing, the medieval layout and buildings within the village are still intact, making Volpaia one of the best-preserved villages of its period.

Volpaia’s viticultural beginnings
The first document that mentions the cultivation of vines in Volpaia dates back to 1172. In 1250, Volpaia was a founding member of the Lega del Chianti (Chianti League). The Florentine Republic formed the Lega by dividing its communities into three districts, Castellina, Radda, and Giaole, and allotting each a certain amount of territory. Volpaia was included in the League's Terziere di Radda. The territories were front-line garrison towns for Florence in the Florentine-Sienese wars, and the emblem for the Chianti League was the Gallo Nero or Black Rooster — the current trademark for Consorzio Vino Chianti Classico.

The della Volpaia family
The winery's logo features the coat of arms from the illustrious della Volpaia family, who lived in the village and took its name from the town itself. Lorenzo della Volpaia (1446–1512), an architect, goldsmith, mathematician and clockmaker, founded a Florentine dynasty of clockmakers and scientific-instrument makers that included his sons, Camillo, Benvenuto and Eufrosino, and nephew Girolamo. As clockmaker, he gained fame and honor with the construction of the Orologio dei Pianeti (Planetary Clock) in 1510. Lorenzo also built the clock at the Palazzo Vecchio in Florence. He was a friend of Leonardo da Vinci and often gave him advice on technical problems; Lorenzo even took part in the discussions on the placement of Michelangelo’s David. The della Volpaia family instruments are on display at the Science Museums in Florence and Greenwich, United Kingdom, the Palazzo Vecchio in Florence and the Adler Planetarium in Chicago.

After the fall of the Republic of Siena in 1554 at the Battle of Marciano, the castle of Volpaia lost its strategic importance, but it continued prominence in its wine and olive oil making renown.

A viticultural renaissance at Volpaia
Raffaello Stianti, one of Italy’s preeminent printers and bookbinders, adored his daughter, Giovannella. On the occasion of her fifteenth birthday, Raffaello presented Giovannella with an 18th-century Florentine ring in the shape of two foxes. Volpaia means “fox’s lair” in Italian, thus, in Giovannella's opinion, “sealing her destiny.” 
Raffaello bought the Volpaia estate, including two-thirds of the village, in 1966. When Giovannella married Carlo Mascheroni in 1972, Raffaello gave the village and winery to the young couple as a wedding gift.

By the mid-1970s, Carlo and Giovannella decided to modernize the winery and produce wines — all without altering the external structure of the 11th-century village. They converted several historical sites to cellars, offices and apartments. Within the castle, whole floors were removed, roofs were raised and carefully re-laid with their original tiles, while abandoned churches were fitted with the latest stainless-steel equipment. Giovannella and Carlo were the first in the Chianti Classico region to utilize temperature-controlled fermentation techniques.

The Stianti Mascheroni family also installed an amazing “wineduct” that connects the winery's stainless-steel fermentation tanks in the upper part of the village to the various barrel cellars in the lower portion of the village. The wine passes by gravity through the stainless steel pipes that are hidden below the village's sidewalks. Because the entire village of Volpaia is protected by the Soprintendenza dei Beni Culturali e Ambientali, part of Italy's Ministry of Arts and Culture, the Stianti Mascheronis were required to number each stone that was removed in the process of building the wineduct, and then return the stones to their original locations once the wineduct was in place.

Nearly every five years the family has updated the cellars with the most modern vinification technologies. Barriques are replaced every vintage. In the last 35 years, the family has replanted most of its vineyards, using the best Sangiovese clones available, while at the same time preserving the oldest Sangiovese clones in the region in a specific collection.

Vineyards, philosophies
The highest-elevation winery in the Chianti area, Castello di Volpaia owns approximately 46 hectares (114 acres) of vineyards, which are situated at 1,300-2,100 feet above sea level on the southern hillsides leading up to the village. Volpaia is also committed to organic farming practices and complies with all the organic viticulture legislation for the production of wine.

Today

Winemaking at Volpaia
In an effort to get the fruit to the cellars in optimum condition, the grapes are carried in boxes that never exceed 30–40 lb. each. Using the containers also makes it easier to select which grapes will go into the Riserva. The containers are loaded onto a specially designed, five-tire trailer and delivered to the cellars within ten minutes.

At the Winery
As soon as the grapes arrive at the winery, they are sorted and destemmed. After destemming, the grapes are then delicately pressed, just to break the skins, and this must be immediately transferred to temperature-controlled, stainless-steel vats that hold between 1,585 and 3,170 gallons. These specialized vats are divided into two separate tanks stacked on top of one another. The gradual increase in temperature results in more complex flavors in the finished wine. This top tank is also equipped with pistons to gently punch down the cap from above. Once enough color and flavor have been extracted, the juice is separated from the must, by gravity, and goes to the bottom tank to finish fermentation.

Moving and aging
Once initial fermentation is complete, the wine is moved to the barrel cellars, all of which are located in historic buildings throughout the village. In keeping with its efforts to protect the original buildings, Castello di Volpaia created an underground wineduct—a labyrinth of stainless steel pipes hidden far beneath the streets of Volpaia—which transport the wine delicately from tank to barrel. Depending on the wine, malolactic fermentation and aging occur in either 800-gallon Slovenian or French oak casks or in 60-gallon French oak barrels. The French casks are produced by Filippo Gamba, the French barriques by Seguin Moreau; both are medium toasted. This process takes from 12–24 months depending on the wine

Tourism
Every year more than 10,000 people visit Volpaia's cellars. In 1999 Volpaia was ranked first by The Wall Street Journal among the best alternative tourist destinations in Italy preceding Capri, Positano, and many other destinations. The ranking was published in international press worldwide.

Cooking school
Cooking classes are conducted by Giovannella Stianti Mascheroni, proprietress of Volpaia. Giovannella frequently works with celebrity chefs. The cooking school, located in the oldest part of the village, was opened in 2000. Facilities include a professional kitchen with ample work space for up to 20 students as well as wine tasting space and indoor/outdoor dining areas. Classes are hands on and given on complete menus from antipasto to dessert or on a single theme such as first courses, main courses, desserts, olive oil, etc. Classes can be conducted in Italian, English or French. Lessons include cooking demonstrations with an emphasis on technique, lessons on food and wine pairing and how to serve Italian menus. Students learn to prepare dishes from all over Italy, with particular attention paid to Tuscan food and relying on local ingredients that are widely available.

Enoteca and Osteria
The Castello di Volpaia wine shop is located in what was once the principal tower of the castle – the village jail in a previous incarnation. The tasting room is reached by passing through narrow corridors and ancient staircases.

Art exhibitions
For 13 years until 1993, with the help of Luciano Pistoi, a famous Italian gallerist and art collector, Volpaia was the highlight for contemporary art in Italy. Piero Gilardi, Ardengo Soffici, Salvatore Scarpitta, John Long, Enzo Cucchi, Giulio Paolini, Giorgio Moranti, Alberto Burri and many others showed in Volpaia their works.

References

External links 
Castello di Volpaia official site
Chianti Classico Wine Producers Association

Wineries of Italy
Radda in Chianti

de:Castello di Volpaia
it:Volpaia